Yemma may refer to:
 Yemma: mother in Arabic, Berber and Hebrew 

 Yemma (bug), a genus of stilt bugs
 Yemma, a former village on the site of present-day Yavne'el, Israel
 Yem people, an ethnic group in south-western Ethiopia
 Yama, a Hindu and Buddhist deity